Leonard Dawea is an Anglican bishop.

He was from his consecration on 11 September 2016 the fifth Bishop of Temotu, one of the nine dioceses that make up the Anglican Church of Melanesia: In 2019 he was elected Archbishop of Melanesia; he was installed on 15 September 2019.

References

21st-century Anglican bishops in Oceania
Anglican bishops of Temotu
Anglican archbishops of Melanesia
Year of birth missing (living people)
Living people